Presidential elections were held in Honduras on 28 February 1887. The result was a victory for the incumbent president Luis Bográn.

Background
In January Bográn convened a council of notables to discuss a potential successor. Despite stating that he was opposed to the idea of re-election in his opening speech, a majority of the members of the council requested he contest the elections.

Bográn's main opponent was former president Céleo Arias, who was supported by Policarpo Bonilla.

Results
The election was described as "one of the freest, least violent, and perhaps even fairest ballotings in the country’s history".

References

Honduras
1887 in Honduras
Presidential elections in Honduras
Election and referendum articles with incomplete results